Carlos Maximiliano Estévez (born June 9, 1977) is a former Argentine footballer. His last club Club Sportivo Estudiantes. Estévez is nicknamed Chanchi.

He has played for Racing Club de Avellaneda and Olimpo de Bahía Blanca in Argentina, Racing de Santander in Spain and Estudiantes de Mérida in Venezuela and Amadora in Portugal.

The highlight of his career was with Racing Club during 2001, when he won with the team the Argentine league. This way, Racing broke a 35-year period without local titles.

References

External links
 Maximiliano Estévez at BDFA.com.ar 
 

1977 births
Living people
Footballers from Buenos Aires
Argentine footballers
Argentine expatriate footballers
Association football forwards
Racing Club de Avellaneda footballers
Olimpo footballers
La Liga players
Estudiantes de Mérida players
Racing de Santander players
C.D. Antofagasta footballers
Cerro Porteño players
C.F. Estrela da Amadora players
Deportivo Merlo footballers
Chilean Primera División players
Argentine Primera División players
Primeira Liga players
Expatriate footballers in Chile
Expatriate footballers in Paraguay
Expatriate footballers in Portugal
Argentine expatriate sportspeople in Spain